The Speaker of the Provincial Assembly of Punjab (Urdu: اسپیکر پنجاب اسمبلی) is the presiding official of the Punjab Assembly.  

Informally, the Speaker is also called Speaker Punjab Assembly.  

The office originated in 1921, before Pakistan became independent. It was re-established in 1951 in accordance with the Constitution; the Speaker presides over the chamber composed of Punjab's elected representatives.

The Speaker is first in the line of succession to the Governor of Punjab. He also occupies the third position in the Warrant of Precedence, after the Governor and the Chief Minister. In addition, the Speaker takes a non-partisan approach to presiding over the  Assembly, and he is its spokesman to the outside world.

Former Speakers of the Provincial Assembly of Punjab

See also
 Governor of Punjab, Pakistan
  Chief Minister of Punjab
 Senior Minister of Punjab (Pakistan)
 Leader of the Opposition of Punjab (Pakistan)
 Chief Secretary Punjab
 Provincial Assembly of Punjab
 Government of Punjab, Pakistan
 Punjab, Pakistan

References
   

Provincial Assembly of the Punjab